Mynydd Machen or Machen Mountain is a  hill lying between the town of Risca and the village of Machen in Caerphilly County Borough in south Wales.  Its summit is crowned by a trig point and a mast.

Geology 
The hill lies at the southeastern extremity of the South Wales Coalfield where the varied Carboniferous Period rock strata of the coalfield margin are tilted steeply northwestwards into the coalfield basin. The sequence which outcrops on Mynydd Machen in northeast-southwest aligned bands is this (oldest at base):

Warwickshire Group
Pennant Sandstone Formation
Brithdir Member
Rhondda member
Deri Member
South Wales Coal Measures Group
South Wales Middle Coal Measures Formation
South Wales Lower Coal Measures Formation
Marros Group
Bishopston Mudstone Formation
Twrch Sandstone Formation
Pembroke Limestone Group

The summit of the hill is formed from the sandstone of the ‘Brithdir Member’ of the Pennant Sandstone Formation. A large quarry towards the south of the hill works the dolomitic limestone of the Pembroke Limestone Group.

Access 
Numerous public footpaths criss-cross the hill, some being followed by promoted recreational walking routes such as the Rhymney Valley Ridgeway Walk, the Sirhowy Valley Walk and the Raven Walk. The upper slopes of the hill and most of the woodland which clothes its slopes are mapped as open access under the Countryside and Rights of Way Act 2000 and thereby open to access on foot by the public.

References

External links 
 Images of Mynydd Machen and area on Geograph website

Mountains and hills of Caerphilly County Borough
Marilyns of Wales